Mauidrillia browni is an extinct species of sea snail, a marine gastropod mollusk in the family Horaiclavidae.

Description
The length of the shell attains 7 mm, its diameter 3 mm.

Distribution
This extinct marine species was found in Tertiary strata of the North Otago, New Zealand.

References

  Marwick, J. Some Tertiary Mollusca from North Otago. publisher not identified, 1943
 Maxwell, P.A. (2009). Cenozoic Mollusca. pp. 232–254 in Gordon, D.P. (ed.) New Zealand inventory of biodiversity. Volume one. Kingdom Animalia: Radiata, Lophotrochozoa, Deuterostomia. Canterbury University Press, Christchurch

External links

browni
Gastropods described in 1943